Hunyadi may refer to:
 Hunyadi family, a Hungarian noble family from the Middle Ages
 John Hunyadi, Hungarian general and Regent-Governor of the Kingdom of Hungary
 Laszlo Hunyadi, Hungarian statesman
 Matthias Corvinus ( or ), King of Hungary
 Hunyadi, the 29th day of the month in the Pataphysical calendar